K. K. Government Institution is a public boys' secondary school located in Courtgaon, Munshiganj District, Dhaka Division, Bangladesh. The school offers education for students ranging from sixth to tenth grade (approximately ages of 11–17). It has over 1500 students.

History
The Institution was founded in 1942. It was founded by Abdul Hakim Bikrampuri named after by his uncle (Kazi Kamar Uddin-K.K.) Abdul Hakim Bikrampuri also founded Munshiganj Uccha Balika School. Both these schools are located in Courtgaon, Munshiganj.
The school began with one study session known as Day Shift. In 2008, it started Morning Shift alongside day shift. Morning shifts starts from 7:30 and ends at 12:00. Day shift runs from 12:15 to 5:00.
K.K. Institution became K.K. Govt. Institution as it became a government high school in 1978.

Academics
K.K. Govt. Institution offers only secondary education. It has laboratories for physics, chemistry, biology and computer education and a library with more than 3000 books, journals, newspaper and magazines. The academic year is divided into three terms. Students have to sit for Junior School Certificate(JSC) examination at the end of 8th grade and Secondary School Certificate (SSC) examination at the end of 10th grade. The school employs about 50 teaching staff and 10 non-teaching staff. The student-teacher ratio is 30:1.
The school operates on two different schedules. Each schedules includes six periods and a 30-minute break. Students are provided with snacks by the school. The school is a closed campus; students are not allowed to leave the school during the school hours.

Admissions
Although K.K. Govt. Institution operates from 6th to 10th grade, it only admits students on the 6th grade by an admission test at the beginning of each year. Students admitted through written test for both the morning and day shifts.

Curriculum
English, Bengali, mathematics are the core subjects of all these grades. Three major programs in the 9th and 10th grades are science, business study and humanities.

Campus
Old Building
This is situated in the west side of the campus. The classes of 10th grade are held in this building. Auditorium, Namaz hall, library, all laboratories, office room, tiffin room are in this building.
Headmaster's room and teacher's room are also located in this building.

New Building
This stand on the east side of the campus and founded in 2005. All the classes of 6th to 9th grade are held in this building.

Boarding House
This is a four storied building which is near to the new building and use as hostel for students.

Shaeed Minar
In 2007, the students of '93 batch founded a modern type of shaeed minar in the north side of the campus.

Facilities
 Physics laboratory
 Computer laboratory
 Chemistry laboratory
 Biology laboratory
 Staff office
 Library
 Boarding house
 Common room

Extra activities
 Scouting
 Red crescent
 Educational and cultural competitions
Every year K.K. Govt. Institution runs a great number of cultural and educational competitions like story writing, drawing, drama, reciting poems, debate etc.
 Sports
Sport is the major feature of K.K. Govt. Institution. 100, 200, 400, 1000 meters sprints are one of the major competition along with high jump, long jump etc.
 Publications
K.K. Govt. Institution publishes annually magazines contains school news and writing skills of students and teachers. For every farewell batch the school publishes a book contains about the information of the students and also some memories.

Uniform
Pupils in the school wear white shirt and white pant with shift badge(blue badge is for the day shift and red is for the morning shift). They also have to wear white keds and black belt.

References

High schools in Bangladesh